Moredon Halt railway station was on the Midland and South Western Junction Railway in Wiltshire. The station, a few miles north west of Swindon, opened on 25 March 1913 on the section of the line from Swindon Town to Cirencester that had itself opened in 1883.

Moredon Halt was built primarily for milk traffic and passenger services were not advertised, though it appears to have been used by infrequent passengers throughout its short life. It officially closed in September 1924 but the Oakley book referred to below indicates that passenger receipts were still recorded up to 1935.

The single-platform station faced a siding that led to Moredon power station and up 100 coal wagons arrived each day. The M&SWJR line as a whole closed to passengers in 1961, but coal deliveries to the power station remained until 1969.

Route

References

 Wiltshire Railway Stations, Mike Oakley, Dovecote Press, Wimborne, 2004, 

Disused railway stations in Wiltshire
Former Midland and South Western Junction Railway stations
Railway stations in Great Britain opened in 1913
Railway stations in Great Britain closed in 1924
1913 establishments in England